The Modern School ECNCR is a co-educational independent day and boarding school in Barakhamba Road, New Delhi, India, it was founded in 1920 by Lala Raghubir Singh, a  Delhi-based philanthropist.

The School has two campus, that holds a variety of educational institutions and academic deals. It has several sister schools, including  Modern School New Delhi, and most recently, Modern School, Kundli.

Origin 
Lala Raghubir Singh founded Modern School in 1920 in a Haveli located in Daryaganj, Delhi which belonged to his father, Sultan Singh. Lalaji's vision was to establish a school which would combine the traditions of Indian education with modern educational techniques and foster an all-round growth of a child.

It was the first co-educational school in the city with as many women teachers as men. The first Principal was a Bengali Christian, Kamla Bose. It started off with about 30 students, three of whom were girls. Besides the normal curricula, Modern School also introduced painting (with the  Bengali artist Sarda Ukil), music, carpentry, scouting and military drill under an English sergeant.

History 
The Modern School came into existence on 20 October 1920, with six children on the rolls (the numbers swelled up to twelve by the end of the year) at 24. Then a day boarding school, with 125 scholars on the rolls, it moved to a new and its present location at Barakhamba Road on 4 January 1933.

Growing in strength, year after year, a need arose for expansion and thus the junior wing was moved to Humayun Road and the same formally inaugurated by Pt. Jawahar Lal Nehru in October 1961. The school at the new location came to be known as Raghubir Singh Junior Modern School and gained autonomy in its functioning as a primary school. As the numbers further grew, Savitri Pratap Singh Block was added to the existing building in 1993.

Every year, the School hosts two annual days, where students and teacher show the local community their achievements and showcase their talents.

Current Principal and Headmistress  
The current principal of The Modern School ECNCR is Ms. Abha Sadana while the current headmistress is Ms. Rimpy Verma.

Kundli Campus 
Kundli Campus is one of two campus that are part of the Modern School infrastructure; It is  currently still on development but it already contains the School main buildings.

The campus also contains many other  institutions h, including Ashoka University, Asian Education Society, Birla Institute of Management Technology, among others.

Deepali Campus 
The Deepali Campus hosts Modern School Early Childhood Education, that works under a program that promotes students participation and creativity through several activities, it is run under the principle of "learning by doing".

References 

Boarding schools in Delhi
Private schools in Delhi
Educational institutions established in 1920
New Delhi
1920 establishments in India